CKLF like MARVEL transmembrane domain-containing 7 (i.e. CMTM7), previously termed chemokine-like factor superfamily 7 (i.e. CKLFSF7), is a protein that in humans is encoded by the CMTM7 gene. This gene, which is located in band 22 on the short (i.e. "p") arm of chromosome 3, and the protein that it encodes belong to the CKLF-like MARVEL transmembrane domain-containing family. Through the process of alternative splicing, the CMTM7 gene encodes two isoforms, CMTM7-v1 and CMTM7-v2, with CMTM7-v1 being the main form expressed and studied. CMTM7 proteins are widely expressed in normal human tissues.

Function
CMTM7 protein levels are low in the malignant tissues of various cancers such as those of esophagus, stomach, pancreas, liver, lung, cervix, and breast. as compared with its expression in the normal tissues of these organs. Furthermore, the forced overexpression of CMTM7 protein in various cancer immortalized cell lines inhibit their proliferation and motility in culture as well as their ability to form tumors in a nude mouse experimental model of cancer. These findings suggest that the CMTM7 protein acts to inhibit the development and/or progression of these cancers and therefore that the CMTM7 gene acts as tumor suppressor in these cancers. However, further studies are needed to support these suggestion and determine if expression of the CMTM7 can be used as a clinical marker of these cancers severity/prognosis and/or as therapeutic targets for treating them.

References

Further reading 

Human proteins
DNA replication
Gene expression
Transcription coregulators